The Diving competition in the 1965 Summer Universiade in Budapest, Hungary.

Medal overview

Medal table

References
 

1965 Summer Universiade
1965
1965 in diving